The rufous-tailed foliage-gleaner (Anabacerthia ruficaudata) is a species of bird in the family Furnariidae. It is found in Bolivia, Brazil, Colombia, Ecuador, French Guiana, Guyana, Peru, Suriname, and Venezuela. Its natural habitat is subtropical or tropical moist lowland forests.

References

rufous-tailed foliage-gleaner
Birds of the Amazon Basin
Birds of the Guianas
rufous-tailed foliage-gleaner
Birds of Brazil
Taxonomy articles created by Polbot